Betty Cavanna (June 24, 1909  – August 13, 2001) was the author of popular teen romance novels, mysteries, and children's books for 45 years. She also wrote under the names Elizabeth Headley and Betsy Allen. She was nominated for the Edgar Award for Best Juvenile in 1970 and 1972.

Personal life

Cavanna had infantile paralysis when she was four years old, which left her unable to walk for several years. Later, she was able to walk with a steel brace.  Her first job was on a Camden newspaper at age 12. Cavanna studied journalism at Douglass College, which is now part of Rutgers University. After college, she worked for a newspaper in Bayonne. Later, she worked in publicity and advertising for the Presbyterian Board of Christian Education in Philadelphia.

Cavanna married Edward Headley in 1940 and they had one son. Headley died in 1952. In 1957, she married George Russell Harrison, a writer and a dean of science at the Massachusetts Institute of Technology. Harrison died in 1979. For the last few years of her life, Cavanna lived in Vézelay, France. She died at age 92 in 2001.

Writing career

Cavanna began writing in 1940. She published serials in American Girl, Boys Today, Gateway for Girls, Pioneer for Boys and other teenage magazines.

Like many novels for teen girls of the era (notably Rosamond du Jardin's and Anne Emery's, which are often discussed with Cavanna's), her plots favored romance and conformity. The choice of the right dress and the right boyfriend were often the key to happiness. Cavanna's heroines generally had a special interest or ambition, and tended to be not typically "pretty". Her early romance novels presented a protagonist facing a personal problem, but her later novels matured to focus on a social or moral problem.

Cavanna wrote the Connie Blair books, a career and mystery series, as "Betsy Allen". A friend of Cavanna's wrote the final book in the series in 1958, The Mystery of the Ruby Queens. In the 1960s,  Cavanna wrote a series of books about the lives of boys in foreign countries. Her husband, George Harrison, took the photographs used in the books.

Richard Alm characterizes Cavanna as "a writer of some importance". Cavanna's books have been translated into several foreign languages. Her manuscripts and correspondence are preserved in the de Grummond Collection at the University of Southern Mississippi.

Books

As Betty Cavanna

As Elizabeth Headley
1946, A Date for Diane
1947, Take a Call, Topsy! (reprinted under name Betty Cavanna as Ballet Fever in 1978)
1949, She's My Girl! (reprinted under name Betty Cavanna as You Can't Take Twenty Dogs on a Date in 1979)
1951, Catchpenny Street (reprinted under name Betty Cavanna in 1975)
1955, Diane's New Love
1957, Tourjours Diane

As Betsy Allen
 1948, The Clue in Blue
 1948, The Riddle in Red
 1948. Puzzle in Purple
 1948, The Secret of Black Cat Gulch
 1949, The Green Island Mystery
 1950, The Ghost Wore White
 1951, The Yellow Warning
 1953, The Gray Menace
 1954, The Brown Satchel Mystery
 1955, Peril in Pink
 1956, The Silver Secret
 1958, The Mystery of the Ruby Queens

References

External links
Betty Cavanna on Worldcat.org

20th-century American novelists
American women novelists
American writers of young adult literature
American romantic fiction novelists
Writers from Camden, New Jersey
1909 births
2001 deaths
20th-century American women writers